Kovylevo is a rural locality (a village) in Mayskoye Rural Settlement, Vologodsky District, Vologda Oblast, Russia. The population was 6 as of 2002.

Geography 
Kovylevo is located 24 km northwest of Vologda (the district's administrative centre) by road. Pailovo is the nearest rural locality. mesha creek 
 the road from Semenkovo to the village was made with the personal money of the Kochurovs, from the highway to Semionkovo with the money of the residents of Kovylevo, Pailovo, Semionkovo  8 houses, 2 for sale

References 

Rural localities in Vologodsky District